David Ray "Dave" Nagle (born April 15, 1943) is an American politician and lawyer from Iowa. He was a Representative in the United States House of Representatives, representing Iowa's 3rd congressional district from 1987 to 1993. He is a member of the Democratic Party.

Education
Nagle received his undergraduate degree from the University of Northern Iowa and his law degree from the University of Iowa.

Career
He served as an Assistant County Attorney for Black Hawk County, Iowa from 1969 to 1970. He served as the City Attorney of Evansdale, Iowa from 1972 to 1973. From 1975 to 1980 he served as a member and later president of the Black Hawk County Conservation Board. He served as an adjunct professor at University of Northern Iowa from 1978 to 1981. From 1980 to 1983 he served on the Board of Governors of the Association of Trial Lawyers of Iowa. From 1982 to 1985 he served as Chairman of the Iowa Democratic Party.

While Nagle was in Congress, Iowa had six seats in the House.  At the time the 3rd congressional district covered a portion of eastern and central Iowa. Following the 1990 census, re-apportionment reduced Iowa's representation from six seats down to five.  The redistricting plan approved combined the 3rd congressional district and what was 2nd congressional district into one district. In the 1992 election, Dave Nagle ran against and was defeated by fellow incumbent Jim Nussle. In the 1994 election, he lost to Nussle again.

He attempted to run for the U.S. Senate, but withdrew after his arrest on a public intoxication charge in 1998.

In November 2001, he announced he was running against Jim Nussle who was at the time was serving the 1st Congressional district of Iowa. He later lost in the state's Democratic Primary to Mayor Ann Hutchinson of Bettendorf, Iowa.

Post-political career
He practices law in Waterloo, Iowa.

Other activities
On August 5, 2011 he was inducted into the Iowa Democratic Party's Hall of Fame.

In February 2016, he was chosen by state Democratic Party chairwoman Andy McGuire to head a review panel which later examined the results of the 2016 state caucuses.

References

External links 

Martindale-Hubbell Law Profile

1943 births
Living people
People from Grinnell, Iowa
University of Northern Iowa alumni
People from Cedar Falls, Iowa
University of Iowa College of Law alumni
University of Iowa College of Law faculty
Democratic Party members of the United States House of Representatives from Iowa